Manuel Ruiz Sosa (10 April 1937 – 12 December 2009) was a Spanish football midfielder and manager.

Honours

Player
Atlético Madrid
La Liga: 1965–66
Copa del Generalísimo: 1964–65

Manager
Granada
Segunda División B: 1982–83

External links
 
 
 
 
 

1937 births
2009 deaths
People from Coria del Río
Sportspeople from the Province of Seville
Spanish footballers
Footballers from Andalusia
Association football midfielders
La Liga players
Tercera División players
Sevilla FC players
Atlético Madrid footballers
Granada CF footballers
Spain under-21 international footballers
Spain B international footballers
Spain international footballers
Spanish football managers
Segunda División managers
Segunda División B managers
Alicante CF managers
UE Lleida managers
Real Jaén managers
CD Alcoyano managers
Real Oviedo managers
Algeciras CF managers
RSD Alcalá managers
Granada CF managers
Córdoba CF managers
CP Almería managers
Atlético Madrid B managers
Sevilla Atlético managers